Ronald S. Monsegue (born May 17, 1942 in Trinidad) is a retired athlete from Trinidad and Tobago who specialized in the 100 metres.

At the 1967 Pan American Games he finished seventh in the 100 metres, fourth in the 4 × 100 metres relay and sixth in the 4 × 400 metres relay. He also competed at the 1968 Summer Olympics.

He graduated from Moorhead State College, Minnesota, USA.

External links 
 Best of Trinidad
 Profile at Sports-Reference.com

1942 births
Living people
Minnesota State University Moorhead alumni
Trinidad and Tobago male sprinters
Athletes (track and field) at the 1967 Pan American Games
Pan American Games competitors for Trinidad and Tobago
Athletes (track and field) at the 1968 Summer Olympics
Olympic athletes of Trinidad and Tobago